The 1941–42 season was the third Scottish football season in which Dumbarton competed in regional football during World War II.

Scottish Southern League

The second season of the Scottish Southern League saw Dumbarton continue to improve their performances by finished 12th out of 16 with 26 points - 32 behind champions Rangers.  Boosted by player 'guest' appearances Dumbarton could just about compete on an equal footing with the 'bigger' clubs.

League Cup South

For the second successive season, Dumbarton failed to qualify from the sectional games.

Summer Cup

Dumbarton fell at the first hurdle to Motherwell.

Player statistics

|}

Source:

Transfers

Players in

Players out 

In addition John Casey and Geoffrey Lockwood both played their last games in Dumbarton 'colours'.

Source:

References

Dumbarton F.C. seasons
Scottish football clubs 1941–42 season